Louise Abbott (born in 1950) is a Canadian non-fiction writer, photographer, and filmmaker living in Quebec's Eastern Townships. She graduated from McGill University in 1972, and is a writer and photographer, with work having appeared in: the Montreal Gazette, The Globe and Mail, The Canadian Encyclopedia, Canadian Heritage and Photo Life.

Awards
Abbott received the 2002 Canadian Journalism Foundation Greg Clark Internship Award, and in the same year the Professional Writers Association of Canada's Norman Kucharsky Award for Cultural and Artistic Journalism.
Her first book, The Coast Way: A Portrait of the English on the Lower North Shore of the St. Lawrence, was a finalist for the 1989 QSPELL Award (Quebec Society for the Promotion of English-Language Literature, now the Quebec Writers' Federation).

In 2014, her documentary, Nunaaluk: A Forgotten Story, won the inaugural Jasper Short Film Festival Best Film by an Established Filmmaker award.

Publications
 The Coast Way: A Portrait of the English on the Lower North Shore of the St Lawrence (McGill-Queen's University Press, 1988)
 The French Shore
 A Country So Wild and Grand
 The Heart of the Farm
 Eeyou Istchee: Land of the Cree/Terre des Cris (COTA, 2010)
 Memphrémagog: An Illustrated History (volume 1)

Films
 The Pinnacle and the Poet
 Alexander Walbridge: The Visionary of Mystic
 Giving Shelter
 Crisscrossing Space and Time
 A Journey to Remember
 Nunaaluk: A Forgotten Story

References

External links
 Rural Route Communications
 Studio Georgeville

Canadian photojournalists
Canadian women journalists
Canadian women non-fiction writers
Canadian documentary film directors
Journalists from Quebec
Living people
1950 births
Writers from Quebec
McGill University alumni
20th-century Canadian photographers
21st-century Canadian photographers
20th-century Canadian non-fiction writers
21st-century Canadian non-fiction writers
20th-century Canadian women writers
21st-century Canadian women writers
Canadian women documentary filmmakers
Canadian women film directors